Isidro Montoya Valencia (born November 3, 1990 in Turbo, Antioquia) is a sprinter from Colombia. He competed in the 100 metres at the 2012 Summer Olympics in London.

Personal bests
100 m: 10.15 s (wind: +2.0 m/s) –  Cali, 29 August 2014
200 m: 20.71 s (wind: -1.1 m/s) –  Medellín, 29 April 2017

Achievements

References

External links
 

1990 births
Living people
Colombian male sprinters
Athletes (track and field) at the 2012 Summer Olympics
Olympic athletes of Colombia
South American Games gold medalists for Colombia
South American Games medalists in athletics
Competitors at the 2010 South American Games
Athletes (track and field) at the 2011 Pan American Games
Pan American Games competitors for Colombia
Sportspeople from Antioquia Department
21st-century Colombian people